Perpolita is a genus of air-breathing land snails, terrestrial pulmonate gastropod mollusks in the family Gastrodontidae.

Species
Species within this genus include:

Perpolita binneyana 
Perpolita boettgeriana 
Perpolita dalliana 
 †Perpolita disciformis 
Perpolita electrina 
 †Perpolita gliesei 
Perpolita hammonis 
 † Perpolita mattiaca (O. Boettger, 1903) 
 †Perpolita miocaenica 
Perpolita petronella 
Perpolita pulchra 
 † Perpolita riedeli Schlickum & Strauch, 1975 
 † Perpolita subhammonis 
Perpolita suzannae 
 † Perpolita wenzi Schlickum & Strauch, 1975

References

 Bouchet P., Rocroi J.P., Hausdorf B., Kaim A., Kano Y., Nützel A., Parkhaev P., Schrödl M. & Strong E.E. (2017). Revised classification, nomenclator and typification of gastropod and monoplacophoran families. Malacologia. 61(1-2): 1-526.
 Hausdorf, B. (1998). Phylogeny of the Limacoidea sensu lato (Gastropoda: Stylommatophora). Journal of Molluscan Studies, 64 (1): 35-66. London
 Bank, R. A. (2017). Classification of the Recent terrestrial Gastropoda of the World. Last update: July 16th, 2017

External links
 AnimalBase info at: 

Gastrodontidae